Chaville is a commune in the Hauts-de-Seine department and Île-de-France region of north-central France. It lies some 12 km from the centre of Paris in the south-western suburbs of the French capital.

Geography
Chaville is bordered by the following communes (clockwise from the north):
Sèvres
Meudon
Vélizy-Villacoublay
Viroflay
Ville-d'Avray.

Roughly 44% of the territory of the commune, situated between the forest of Meudon to the south-east and the forest of Fausses-Reposes to the north-west, is wooded.

History
Chaville was founded in the 9th century by Inchadus, Bishop of Paris. The earliest recorded form of the name is Inchadi villa.

Population

Transport
Chaville is located on route D910 between Paris and Versailles. It is served by three railway stations and one bus line:
Gare de Chaville-Rive-Droite, on the Transilien suburban rail line from Paris-Saint-Lazare to Versailles-Rive-Droite
Gare de Chaville-Rive-Gauche, on the Transilien suburban rail line from Paris-Montparnasse to Rambouillet
Chaville-Vélizy station on Paris RER line C

Education
 there are five preschools (maternelles) with 730 students total: Les Iris, Les Jacinthes, Le Muguet, Les Myosotis, and Les Pâquerettes As of the same year there are three elementary schools with 1,000 students total: Anatole France, Paul Bert, and Ferdinand Buisson. There is one junior high school, Collège Jean Moulin de Chaville.

It is served by the public high school/sixth-form college Lycée Jean Pierre Vernant in Sèvres.

Twin towns
 Alsfeld, Hesse, Germany
 Barnet, London, England, United Kingdom
 Settimo Torinese, Piedmont, Italy
 Thanh Hóa, Vietnam
 Mountain Lakes, New Jersey, United States

See also
Communes of the Hauts-de-Seine department

References

External links

 Chaville website (in French)

Communes of Hauts-de-Seine